Beulah Hill is an unincorporated community in Wirt County, West Virginia, United States.

References

Unincorporated communities in Wirt County, West Virginia
Unincorporated communities in West Virginia